The Hans Egede medal is awarded by the Royal Danish Geographical Society for outstanding services to geography, "principally for geographical studies and research in the Polar lands." It was instituted in 1916 and named after Hans Egede, a Danish missionary who established a mission in Greenland.

Recipients
Source: Royal Danish Geographical Society 
 1921: Peter Freuchen ; Godfred Hansen ; Morten P. Porsild
 1924: Knud Rasmussen 
 1925: Roald Amundsen
 1927: Lauge Koch
 1932: Henry George Watkins ; Therkel Mathiassen
 1933: Ejnar Mikkelsen ; Kaj Birket-Smith
 1937: Hans Wilhelmsson Ahlmann
 1947: Pálmi Hannesson
 1951: Eigil Knuth
 1955: Helge Larsen
 1959: Vivian Fuchs
 1960: Paul A. Siple
 1971: Willi Dansgaard ; Børge Fristrup
 1976: Knud Ellitsgaard-Rasmussen ; Jørgen Meldgaard
 1980: Bent Fredskild
 1982: Gunnar Østrem
 1984: Trevor Lloyd
 1986: Preben Gudmandsen
 1992: Niels Steen Gundestrup
 1996: Bent Hasholt ; Johannes Krüger
 2017: Bo Elberling, for his contributions to research on the Arctic

See also

 List of geography awards
 Prizes named after people

References

Article based in part on Hans Egede Medaillen article in Danish Wiki

Geography awards
Danish awards
Awards established in 1916